Bid Khvah  is a village in Khwahan Badakhshan Province in north-eastern Afghanistan.

References

External links

Populated places in Khwahan District